Jean-Paul Richter (7 June 1847 – 25 August 1937) was a German art historian.

Born in Dresden as the son of a theologian, Richter studied theology himself, becoming tutor to the young Alexander Frederick, Landgrave of Hesse. His appointment as tutor gave him the opportunity to travel around Europe and he became interested in Italian art. He wrote tourist guides for Baedecker and in 1876 met Giovanni Morelli, whom he later introduced to Bernard Berenson. He moved to London in 1877 and wrote several catalogues of art, but is chiefly remembered today for his work on the notebooks of Leonardo da Vinci.

His wife Luise Marie Schwaab and their daughters Irma and Gisela M. A. Richter were also art historians.

References 

 Richter in the French national library

1847 births
1937 deaths
Writers from Dresden
German art historians